Shawn N. Jasper (born January 23, 1959) is an American politician from the state of New Hampshire. A member of the Republican Party, he serves as the Commissioner of the New Hampshire Department of Agriculture, Markets, and Food, and is a former Speaker of the New Hampshire House of Representatives.

Biography
Jasper graduated from Alvirne High School in Hudson, New Hampshire, in 1977. He received an associate degree in business administration from the University of New Hampshire. He has served as advisor to the Alpha Gamma Rho Omega Chapter, of the University of New Hampshire since 1986. He was elected to the New Hampshire House in 1984, and served one two-year term. He was elected again in 1988, and served through 1994. He was elected to the state House again in 2002. He also served for 16 years on the Hudson Board of Selectmen, but lost his bid for reelection in 2012.

In the 2014 elections, Jasper was reelected to his 11th term in the New Hampshire House. Republicans retook the majority in the New Hampshire House from the Democratic Party in the 2014 election. After the election, William L. O'Brien, the former Republican Speaker of the House, ran for Speaker against Democrat Steve Shurtleff. Enough Republicans voted for Shurtleff on the first ballot that O'Brien did not receive the majority. Shurtleff then dropped out of the race, and Jasper entered. On the third ballot, Jasper received the majority of all ballots cast, defeating O'Brien with the majority of Democratic members and some Republicans voting for him.

In October 2017, Governor Chris Sununu nominated Jasper to lead the state's agriculture department. Jasper has led the New Hampshire Department of Agriculture, Markets, and Food since December 11, 2017.

References

External links

1959 births
Living people
Politicians from Nashua, New Hampshire
Speakers of the New Hampshire House of Representatives
Republican Party members of the New Hampshire House of Representatives
University of New Hampshire alumni
21st-century American politicians
State agriculture commissioners in the United States